Jason Alexander McCartney (born 29 January 1968) is a British Conservative Party politician who has been the member of Parliament (MP) for Colne Valley in West Yorkshire since 2019, and from 2010 to 2017. He is a former TV sports reporter.

Early life and career
McCartney was born on 29 January 1968 in Harrogate, West Riding of Yorkshire, to Wing Commander Robert McCartney and Jean McCartney. He was educated at Lancaster Royal Grammar School and RAF College, Cranwell. McCartney went on to serve as an officer in the Royal Air Force for nine years, fulfilling tours in Las Vegas, Turkey and Iraq. After reaching the rank of Flight Lieutenant, he resigned his commission in 1997. In 2011, he became Honorary President of the Huddersfield Branch of the RAF Association.

After studying for a postgraduate diploma in broadcast journalism at Leeds Trinity & All Saints, McCartney worked as a reporter for BBC Radio Leeds, notably interviewing Northern Ireland Secretary Mo Mowlam in 1997. From 1998 until 2007, he worked as a presenter for ITV Yorkshire, most notable on the regional Calendar news programme.

McCartney unsuccessfully stood as a Liberal Democrat candidate for the Pudsey ward of Leeds City Council in 2006.

From 2008 to 2010, he was a senior lecturer at Leeds Metropolitan University.

Member of Parliament

2010–2017
McCartney changed party affiliation, and was selected as the Conservative prospective parliamentary candidate for Colne Valley in March 2007. McCartney stood in the 2010 general election, taking the Colne Valley seat with a majority of 4,837 and replacing Labour's incumbent Kali Mountford. He gave his maiden speech on 17 June 2010 in a debate on the economy, expressing his support for local rural Post Offices.

In November 2010, William Hague appointed McCartney to the NATO Parliamentary Assembly UK Delegation. McCartney served on the Transport Select Committee from 10 June 2013 to 30 March 2015. He was also a member of the 1922 Committee's Executive Committee from 2013 to 2017.

He was one of the few Conservative Members of Parliament who voted against an increase to the cap on university tuition fees and supported the need for a referendum on the EU. McCartney holds strong views on welfare, and consistently voted to reduce housing benefit, and generally voted against raising welfare benefits in line with prices. In the run up to the 2015 general election, McCartney took the unusual step of replying to a constituent who disagreed with the Coalition's austerity plan with a letter recommending they backed the Green Party candidate instead. McCartney told the constituent he respected their differences of opinion but the Green Party candidate was "the only candidate who matches what you believe". Labour accused him of trying to split the left wing vote, whilst McCartney said he often put constituents in touch with political rivals if he believed it could help.

McCartney supported Brexit in the 2016 European Union membership referendum. He voted to reject an amendment to the Brexit bill which demanded an analysis of the impact of exiting the EU on the NHS.

McCartney was defeated by the Labour Party candidate, Thelma Walker, in the 2017 general election. After the loss he revealed that the prime minister, Theresa May, had contacted him to apologise and accept responsibility for his defeat.

2019–present
McCartney returned to Parliament in the 2019 general election, winning back Colne Valley with a majority of 5,103. In May 2020, McCartney called for the resignation of Government Chief Advisor Dominic Cummings.

In October 2020, McCartney was one of five Conservative MPs who broke the whip to vote for a Labour opposition day motion to extend the provision of free school meals during school holidays until Easter 2021.

On 13 June 2022, McCartney was appointed Parliamentary Private Secretary to the Attorney General's Office.

Outside Parliament 
From 2017 to 2019, McCartney was Head of Public Affairs at Huddersfield University. In 2018, he became a director of fairandfunky, a community interest company in Yorkshire. He was a member of the One Community Foundation Trust from 2017 to 2019, and on the board of the Mid Yorkshire Chamber of Commerce from 2018 to 2019.

Personal life
McCartney lives in Honley, West Yorkshire, and has two children. He is a member of the Royal Air Force Club, and lists his recreations as "Huddersfield Town AFC, Huddersfield Giants RLFC, Yorkshire CCC, tennis".

References

External links
Official website
Conservative Party profile 
Colne Valley Conservatives

1968 births
Living people
Conservative Party (UK) MPs for English constituencies
UK MPs 2010–2015
UK MPs 2015–2017
UK MPs 2019–present
Royal Air Force officers
Alumni of Leeds Trinity University
Liberal Democrats (UK) politicians
People educated at Lancaster Royal Grammar School